Begluci may refer to:

 Begluci, Bosnia and Herzegovina, a village near Derventa
 Begluci, Croatia, a village near Gračac